The 2022 Club Atlético Boca Juniors season is the 94th consecutive season in the top flight of Argentine football. In addition to the domestic league, Boca Juniors will participate in this season's editions of the Copa de la Liga Profesional, the Supercopa Argentina, the Copa Argentina and the 2022 Copa Libertadores.

Season overview

November
Huracán activated their option to buy Franco Cristaldo permanently from his loan spell.

December
Gastón Ávila, Ramón Ábila, Walter Bou and Mateo Retegui returned from their respective loans. Edwin Cardona ended his loan with Boca and returned to his club.

January
Darío Benedetto rejoins the club after playing between 2016 and 2019, the forward arrives from Marseille. Walter Bou is transferred to Defensa y Justicia. Nicolás Figal arrives from Inter Miami. Lisandro López is transferred to Tijuana. Guillermo Fernández arrives from Cruz Azul. Agustín Obando is loaned to Tigre.

February
Goalkeeper Leandro Brey arrives from Los Andes. Mateo Retegui is loaned to Tigre. Ramón Ábila is transferred to Colón. On the first match of Copa de la Liga Profesional Boca drew 1–1 against Colón. 
On February 16 Boca defeated Aldosivi 2–1. Óscar Romero joins the club on a free transfer, he last played in San Lorenzo. On February 20 Boca defeated Rosario Central 2–1. On February 26 Boca drew 2–2 against Independiente.

March
On march 2 Boca defeated Central Córdoba (R) 4-1 and advanced to the Round of 32 of Copa Argentina. On march 6 Boca lost 0-1 against Huracán. On march 13 Boca defeated Estudiantes (LP) 1-0. On march 20 Boca defeated River 1-0 on the Superclásico.

April
On April 2 Boca drew 2-2 against Arsenal. On the first match of Copa Libertadores Boca lost 0-2 against Deportivo Cali. On April 9 Boca drew 0-0 against Vélez Sarsfield. On April 11 Boca defeated Bolivian Always Ready 2-0 in Copa Libertadores. On April 17 Boca drew 1-1 against Lanús. On April 20 Boca drew 1-1 against Godoy Cruz. On April 23 Boca defeated Central Córdoba (SdE) 2-1. On April 26 Boca lost 0-2 against Brazilian Corinthians in Copa Libertadores. On April 30 Boca defeated Barracas Central 2-0 and qualified to the final stages of 2022 Copa de la Liga Profesional.

May
On May 4 Boca defeated Bolivian Always Ready 2-0 in Copa Libertadores. On May 7 Boca defeated Tigre 2-0. On May 10 Boca defeated Defensa y Justicia 2-0 and advanced to the semifinals of Copa de la Liga Profesional. On May 14 Boca advanced to the final of Copa de la Liga Profesional after eliminating Racing on penalties. On May 17 Boca drew 1-1 against Brazilian Corinthians in Copa Libertadores. On May 22 Boca defeated Tigre 3-0, winning the Copa de la Liga Profesional and qualifying to 2023 Copa Libertadores. On May 26 Boca defeated Colombian Deportivo Cali 1-0 and qualified to the final stage of Copa Libertadores, facing Corinthians in Round of 16.

June
On the first match of 2022 Primera Division tournament, Boca defeated Arsenal 2-0. On June 8 Boca defeated Ferro Carril Oeste 1-0 and advanced to the Round of 16 of Copa Argentina. On June 12 Boca lost 0-1 against Central Córdoba (SdE). On June 15 Boca defeated Tigre 5-3. On June 15 Boca defeated Barracas Central 3-1. Gonzalo Maroni returns from Atlas and is again loaned to San Lorenzo. Gabriel Vega is loaned to Godoy Cruz. Vicente Taborda is loaned to Platense. On June 24 Boca lost 1-2 against Unión. On June 28 Boca drew 0-0 against Brazilian Corinthians in Copa Libertadores. Eros Mancuso, Cristian Pavón and Eduardo Salvio ended their contract with the club.

July
On July 1 Boca lost 0-3 against Banfield. After another 0-0 draw against Corinthians, Boca lost on penalties and was eliminated of Copa Libertadores. On July 7, Sebastián Battaglia is sacked and Hugo Ibarra is appointed as interim manager. On July 9 Boca lost 1-2 against San Lorenzo. Martín Payero is loaned from Middlesbrough. On July 16 Boca defeated Talleres (C) 1-0. Facundo Roncaglia rejoins the club after playing between 2007 and 2012, the defender arrives on a free transfer from Aris Limassol. On July 19 Boca lost 0-2 against Argentinos Juniors. Gastón Ávila is transferred to Antwerp. On July 24 Boca defeated Estudiantes (LP) 3-1. Carlos Izquierdoz is transferred to Sporting Gijón. On July 31 Boca lost 0-3 against Patronato.

August
On August 6 Boca defeated Platense 2-1. Goalkeeper Sergio Romero arrives on a free transfer from Venezia. On August 10 Boca defeated Agropecuario Argentino 1-0 and advanced to the Quarterfinals of Copa Argentina. On August 14 Boca drew 0-0 against Racing. On August 17 Boca drew 0-0 against Rosario Central. On August 21 Boca defeated Defensa y Justicia 1-0. On August 21 Boca defeated Atlético Tucumán 2-1.

September
On September 4 Boca defeated Colón 2-1. Jorman Campuzano is loaned to Giresunspor. On September 11 Boca defeated River 1-0, winning the Superclásico. On September 14 Boca defeated Lanús 1-0. On September 19 Boca drew 0-0 against Huracán. On September 23 Boca defeated Godoy Cruz 1-0. On September 28 Boca defeated Quilmes 3-2 and advanced to the Semifinals of Copa Argentina.

October
On October 2 Boca defeated Vélez Sarsfield 1-0. On October 9 Boca defeated Aldosivi 2-1. On October 12 Boca defeated Sarmiento (J) 1-0. On October 16 Boca lost 0-2 against Newell's Old Boys. On October 20 Boca defeated Gimnasia y Esgrima (LP) 2-1. On October 23 Boca drew 2-2 against Independiente, winning their 35th title of Primera División. On October 26 Boca lost on penalties against Patronato, being eliminated of Copa Argentina.

November
On november 6 Boca lost 1-2 against Racing in the Trofeo de Campeones.

Current squad

Last updated on November 6, 2022.

Transfers

Summer

In

Out

Winter

In

Out

Competitions

Overall

Primera División

League table

International Qualification

Relegation table

Results summary

Results by round

Matches

Copa de la Liga Profesional

Group stage

Zone 2

Matches

Quarterfinals

Semifinals

Final

Copa Argentina

Round of 64

Round of 32

Round of 16

Quarterfinals

Semifinals

Trofeo de Campeones

Copa Libertadores

Group stage

Final Stages

Team statistics

Season Appearances and goals

|-
! colspan="16" style="background:#00009B; color:gold; text-align:center"| Goalkeepers

|-
! colspan="16" style="background:#00009B; color:gold; text-align:center"| Defenders

|-
! colspan="16" style="background:#00009B; color:gold; text-align:center"| Midfielder

|-
! colspan="16" style="background:#00009B; color:gold; text-align:center"| Forwards

|-
! colspan="16" style="background:#00009B; color:gold; text-align:center"| Players who have made an appearance or had a squad number this season, but have left the club

|}

Top scorers

Top assists

Penalties

Clean sheets

Disciplinary record

Notes

References

External links
 Club Atlético Boca Juniors official web site 

Club Atlético Boca Juniors seasons
2022 in Argentine football